The Hundred of Colebatch is a Hundred of the County of Cardwell (South Australia) centred on Colebatch, South Australia

References

Colebatch